Rostuša is a village and seat of the municipality of Mavrovo and Rostuša, North Macedonia.

History
In the Middle Ages the village was known as Radostuša. In 1426 Gjon Kastrioti and his three sons (one being Skanderbeg) donated the right to the proceeds from taxes collected from the villages Rostuša and Trebište and from the church of Saint Mary, which was in one of them, to Hilandar.

From 1929 to 1941, Rostuša was part of the Vardar Banovina of the Kingdom of Yugoslavia.

Culture
Saint Jovan Bigorski Monastery is located nearby.

Demographics
Rostuša has traditionally been inhabited by Orthodox Macedonians and a Muslim Macedonian (Torbeš) population.

According to the 2002 census, the village had a total of 872 inhabitants. Ethnic groups in the village include:

Macedonians 397
Turks 427
Albanians 41
Bosniaks 2
Others 5

References 

Villages in Mavrovo and Rostuša Municipality
Macedonian Muslim villages